Century of the Dragon is a 1999 Hong Kong crime film directed by Clarence Fok and starring Andy Lau, Louis Koo, Joey Meng and Patrick Tam.

Plot
When Wong Chi-sing (Louis Koo) was training in the police academy, he achieved prominent grades which prompts Superintendent Ko (Joe Lee) to send him undercover before his graduation. After five years, Chi-sing finally gains the trust of Hung Hing Gang's most prominent leader Lung Yat-fei, known as Fei-lung Gor (Andy Lau). One time, Fei-lung's sworn brother Tong Pau (Anthony Wong) was fighting for territories with another triad boss Loan Shark Ko (Steve Lee), which happened on the day of Fei-lung's mother's (Paw Hee-ching) birthday party. Unknown to Pau, the police have planted undercover cop Big Head Man (Eric Wan) in his gang for many years. On that night, Pau was arrested and hospitalized due to heavy injuries.

Since Pau is seriously injured, the Hung Hing Gang forces Fei-lung, who has been dealing with legal business for the past five years, back to the underworld, to which Fei-lung refuses. Pau's son Man-chun (Patrick Tam), a ruthless man, takes the opportunity for vengeance and makes a deal with the elders that whoever is able to find the mole and kill Superintendent Ko and Loan Shark Ko, will get the opportunity to be the new leader. When Chi-sing hears of this, he decides to immediately inform Big Head Man. Since Man lost his pager, Chi-sing was unable to call him and tries to find Man in his son's school. When Chi-sing makes it there, Man has left with his son and while trying to find him everywhere, he finds Man and his son killed by Man-chun and his henchmen.

Man-chun is actually desperate to take his father's position as Hung Hing's leader and pretends to feel sad for his father and tells Chi-sing to kill Superintendent Ko, which Chi-sing neglects. Fei-lung does not want to deal with the underworld and tells Chi-sing to beware of moles around him, which makes Chi-sing feel guilty. Man-chun calls Chi-sing to negotiate with Loan Shark Man, while on the other hand orders his henchmen to sweep Ko's business and rape his wife and daughter. While Ko was negotiating with Chi-sing, he finds out that his business were all swept and his wife and daughter raped and decides to kill Chi-sing before he was rescued by Fei-lung, which makes Ko believe that Fei-lung is behind all this and decides to take revenge on him. Later, Superintendent Ko tells Chi-sing to immediately assist in arresting Fei-ung, but Chi-sing explains to Ko that Man-chun is the mastermind behind this and persuades him to arrest Man-chun instead, which leads Ko to misunderstand that Chi-sing has renegaded and detains him.

When Chi-sing's girlfriend Judy (Joey Meng) learns that Man-chun sent his top henchmen Ma Wong (Frankie Ng) and Fa Fit (Lung Fong) to kidnap Fei-ung's wife Daisy (Suki Kwan), Judy immediately informs Daisy; while on the other hand, Loan Shark Ko has captured Fei-lung's mother to threaten Fei-lung to surrender and Man-chun unexpectedly arrives and kills Ko while trapping Fei-lung, his mother and son in a farm. When Superintendent Ko finds Loan Shark Ko dead in Fei-lung's house, he lists Fei-lung as a wanted criminal.

When Chi-sing rescues Daisy, he learns that Man-chun has captured Fei-lung and his family and goes to find Man-chun in his company. While also with the help of Chi-sing, Daisy was able to avoid being rapped by Man-chun and holds him hostage to the farm to rescue Fei-lung, his mother and son. However, after rescuing Fei-lung where a major gunfight occurs, Daisy was killed by Man-chun in the process.

In the end, Fei-lung decides to take revenge. When Chi-sing learns of this, he immediately rushes to stop him from this mistake. There, Fei-lung uses Chi-sing's gun to resolve Man-chun. Chi-sing shoots Man-chun for self-defense where Man-chun also falls off the building and dies.

Cast
Andy Lau as Lung Yat-fei / Fei-lung Gor
Louis Koo as Wong Chi-sing
Joey Meng as Judy
Patrick Tam as Tong Man-chun
Suki Kwan as Daisy
Anthony Wong as Tong Pau
Paw Hee-ching as Fei-lung's mother
Lawrence Lau as Ken
Frankie Ng as Ma Wong
Lee Siu-kei as Sam
Eric Wan as Big Head Man
Lung Fong as Fa Fit
Joe Lee as Superintendent Ko
Chung Yeung as Cole
Steve Lee as Loan Shark Ko
Yu Man-chun
Fan Chin-hung as thug
Lee To-yue as triad at meeting
Chan Sek
Yee Tin-hung
Adam Chan
Lam Kwok-kit
Chu Cho-kuen
Hon Ping

Box office
The film grossed HK$8,313,482 at the Hong Kong box office during its theatrical run from 15 October to 4 November 1999 in Hong Kong.

See also
Andy Lau filmography
Wong Jing filmography

External links

Century of the Dragon at Hong Kong Cinemagic

Century of the Dragon Film Review at LoveHKFilm.com

1999 films
1999 action thriller films
1999 crime thriller films
1999 crime drama films
Hong Kong action thriller films
Hong Kong crime thriller films
Hong Kong drama films
Triad films
1990s Cantonese-language films
China Star Entertainment Group films
Films directed by Clarence Fok
Films set in Hong Kong
Films shot in Hong Kong
Hong Kong films about revenge
1990s Hong Kong films